Charles James Dugdale, 2nd Baron Crathorne,  (born 12 September 1939), was Lord Lieutenant of North Yorkshire from 1999 until 2014. He is also one of the ninety hereditary peers elected to remain in the House of Lords after the passing of the House of Lords Act 1999, sitting as a Conservative. In 1977, he succeeded to his father's title.

Career

The son of Thomas Dugdale, 1st Baron Crathorne, and Nancy Tennant, he was educated at Eton College in Berkshire. He was further educated at Trinity College, Cambridge, where he graduated with a BA degree (later converted to an MA) in fine arts in 1963. Crathorne worked in the impressionist painting department of Sotheby & Co from 1963 to 1966, when he became assistant to president of the Parke-Bernet Galleries in New York City, a post he held until 1969.

In 1969, he created an independent fine art consultancy, James Dugdale & Associates, which later became James Crathorne & Associates, and has made many lecture tours to the United States. In 1981, Crathorne held a lecture series about "Aspects of England" at the Metropolitan Museum in New York City and in 1988, he made a lecture tour for the bicentenary of Australia, talking about Captain James Cook. From 1979 to 1993, he was director of Blakeney Hotels Ltd, from 1988 to 1999 of Woodhouse Securities Ltd, and from 2000 to 2001 of Hand Picked Hotels. Between 1993 and 1998, he was also director of Cliveden plc, and from 1999 of its successor, Cliveden Ltd.

Crathorne was Honorary Secretary of the All Party Parliamentary Arts and Heritage Group at Westminster for 1981 and became Chairman & Hon. Secretary in 2010, and in 2015 became Co-Chairman & Hon. Sec. Since 1988 he has been a member of the Advisory Panel on Works of Art in the House of Lords and from 1997 he has been Joint Secretary of the All Party Parliamentary Photography Group.

Affiliations

Crathorne was a member of the council of the Royal Society of Arts from 1982 to 1988. He was a member of the court of the University of Leeds from 1985 to 1997, and governor of the Queen Margaret's School, York Ltd from 1986 to 1999. Between 1983 and 2011, he was member of the editorial board of House magazine at Westminster. Since 1987 he was president of the Yarm Civic Society. For the Georgian Group, he has been a member of the executive committee, and was its chair between 1990 and 1999.

Crathorne has been also president of the Cleveland Sea Cadets, of the Cleveland Family History Society as well as of the Hambleton District of the Campaign to Protect Rural England since 1988. He was patron of the Cleveland Community Foundation from 1990 to 2004, and president of the Cleveland and North Yorkshire branch of the Magistrates' Association from 1997 to 2003. For the Joint Committee of the National Amenity Societies, he was deputy chair between 1993 and 1996 and chair between 1996 and 1999.

Since 1997, Crathorne has been vice president of The Public Monuments and Sculpture Association (PMSA), and since 1998 he was president of the Cleveland Mountain Rescue Team. Since 1999, he has been also president of the North Yorkshire County Scout Council, patron of the North Yorkshire Branch of the British Red Cross, as well as member of the court of the University of York and the University of Hull. Crathorne was vice-president of the Yorkshire and the Humber branch of the Reserve Forces and Cadets Association (RFCA) since 1999, and its president from 2006 to 2009. He was further vice-president of the RFCA in North England since 2001, president of the Cleveland and South Durham branch of the Magistrates' Association since 2003 and patron of the Tees Valley Community Foundation since 2004. He was President of The Yorkshire Agricultural Society in 2014–15.

Crathorne has been trustee of the Georgian Theatre Royal in Richmond since 1970, vice-president of the Cleveland Wildlife Trust since 1989, and patron of the Attingham Trust for the Study of the British Country House since 1990. For the Captain Cook Birthplace Museum Trust, he has been trustee since 1978 and chair since 1993. From 1988 to 1994, Crathorne was member of the National Trust of the Yorkshire Regional Committee, and, from 1992 to 1995, he was trustee of the National Heritage Memorial Fund.

Honours and awards
In 1972, Crathorne became a Fellow of the Royal Society of Arts (FRSA). In 1999, he was made a Knight of the Venerable Order of Saint John (KStJ). In 2002, Crathorne received the Queen's Golden Jubilee Medal. He became a Fellow of the Society of Antiquaries of London (FSA) in 2010. In 1999 Crathorne was appointed Lord Lieutenant of North Yorkshire, for which he was appointed Knight Commander of the Royal Victorian Order (KCVO) in the 2013 New Year Honours.

He was awarded an Honorary LLD degree by Teesside University in 2013. The Freedom of the Town of Richmond was conferred on Crathorne on 24 July 2014 by the Town Mayor and Councillors. 
He retired as Lord Lieutenant on 12 September 2014. He was awarded an honorary DUniv degree from the University of York in 2015. The Freedom of the City of York was conferred to Crathorne in April 2015.

Family
From 1970, he was married to Sylvia Mary Montgomery, a daughter of actress Jane Baxter. She died of cancer in 2009. They had two daughters and a son.

Works
Edouard Vuillard Purnell (1967)
Tennant's Stalk (1973) 
A Present from Crathorne (1989)
Cliveden, the Place and the People (1995)
The Royal Crescent Book of Bath (1998)
Parliament in Pictures (1999)

References

External links

1939 births
Alumni of Trinity College, Cambridge
Barons in the Peerage of the United Kingdom
Conservative Party (UK) hereditary peers
Knights Commander of the Royal Victorian Order
Knights of the Order of St John
Living people
Lord-Lieutenants of North Yorkshire
People educated at Eton College
People associated with the Metropolitan Museum of Art
People associated with the University of Hull
People associated with the University of Leeds
People associated with the University of York
Hereditary peers elected under the House of Lords Act 1999